The Museum of the Bible is a museum in Washington D.C., owned by Museum of the Bible, Inc., a non-profit organization established in 2010 by the Green family. The museum documents the narrative, history, and impact of the Bible. It opened on November 17, 2017, and has 1,150 items in its permanent collection and 2,000 items on loan from other institutions and collections.

The museum claims it is nonsectarian and "is not political, and it will not proselytize." Members of the board of directors sign a "faith statement" regarding the truth of the Bible.

In the year before its launch, the museum fielded questions about the acquisition of its collection, including a federal case over smuggled Iraqi antiquities and thousands of clay artifacts, as well as the provenance of some of its exhibits. The museum's dedication ceremony received an official pontifical blessing from Pope Francis, and people in attendance included Cardinal Donald Wuerl, musician CeCe Winans, Senate Chaplain Barry Black, Washington, D.C. Mayor Muriel Bowser, and Israeli Ambassador Ron Dermer.

The Museum of the Bible charges for admission. The museum features dining, including a restaurant called Manna that serves kosher food and the Milk and Honey Café.

History
The museum was established as a nonprofit organization in 2010. The museum's building location and design were announced in 2012 when the Green family purchased the 1923 Terminal Refrigerating and Warehousing Co. building, that used to be the Washington Design Center, two blocks from the National Mall in Washington D.C. The primary donors to the museum at launch were Hobby Lobby and its owners, the Green family and the National Christian Foundation. Former museum president Cary Summers said that the goal is to "reacquaint the world with the book that helped make it, and let the visitor come to their own conclusions. ...We don't exist to tell people what to believe about it". In the initial nonprofit filling in 2010, the purpose of the museum was stated thus: "to bring to life the living word of God, to tell its compelling story of preservation, and to inspire confidence in the absolute authority and reliability of the Bible."

The estimated $400 million project updated the historically protected structure as well as adding two additional floors and a rooftop café and garden. The building's 1923 original red brick, architecture and ornamentation was restored, with new bricks imported from Denmark. The primary building was awarded historical status by the District's Historic Preservation Review Board. The glass-enclosed rooftop provides views of the United States Capitol, the Washington Monument and several Smithsonian museums. The construction efforts were led by Clark Construction. The architectural design team was led by SmithGroup.

Items from the Green Collection, which is owned by Hobby Lobby, were donated to the Museum of the Bible, providing a tax write-off to Hobby Lobby.

Exhibits
The exhibits intend to offer a scholarly perspective on the impact of the Bible in history. Bible scholar David Trobisch, former director of the museum's collections, was hired to advise on new acquisitions, identify the storylines for the museum's exhibits, and supervise a team of thirty scholars and curators. Indiana Wesleyan University professor Jerry Pattengale serves as Executive Director of Education Initiatives. The museum has an external board of advisors, and works with Jewish, Protestant, Catholic, and other religious and secular institutions.

Each of the six floors in the museum contain a different exhibit which emphasizes different aspects of the Bible's history or impact. The first floor combines ancient artifacts with modern technology meant to immerse the participant in the Bible. The front entrance on 4th Street SW features 40-foot (12 meter) tall,  bronze front doors with stained glass art containing a relief depicting the creation account in Genesis. There is also a grand lobby with a 140-foot (42 meter) LED ceiling allowing for changing visual effects and messages.

On the first floor, guests may experience a virtual reality tour of significant locations in the Bible, such as the Sea of Galilee or the Temple Mount. Guests will also find on this floor an exhibit displayed in partnership with the Vatican Museum and Library.
 
The second floor focuses on the Bible's impact on world culture, in areas like science, justice, and freedom. Another section is dedicated to the Bible's impact in American history. There is also a "flying" tour of Washington D.C. and the biblical references found within the city at some of its most notable landmarks.

The third floor presents the general narrative of the Bible from Abraham through the creation of Israel to the ministry of Jesus and the early church. This floor also contains a large Jewish Bible section.

The fourth floor presents biblical history and archaeology. Trobisch stated that the museum "will not whitewash conflicts in Christian history but will explain the arguments that were made at the time".

The fifth level contains a performing arts theater with a 500-person amphitheater. Here, the museum sponsors scholarly lectures, as well as multimedia performances relating to the Bible. Notably, the tour of the Broadway production of Amazing Grace opened at the museum's World State Theater. The fifth floor also contains separate exhibit space for displays presented by the Israel Antiquities Authority.

The sixth floor consists of a rooftop viewing area overlooking the National Mall and U.S. Capitol, stained glass exhibits, and a ballroom that seats 1,000 guests. The museum's artifact research facility and reference library is located in a one-story addition to the roof of a neighboring office complex.

Several museum partners are responsible for the design and layout of the various exhibits. The PRD Group was responsible for the history of the Bible floor. PRD Group has previously collaborated on exhibits at Smithsonian National Museum of American History and National Museum of Natural History. BRC Imagination Arts is developing the narrative of the Bible floor. Jonathan Martin Creative recreated a Nazareth village from the first century. C&G Partners led the design of the impact of the Bible floor. Previous work by C&G Partners includes the United States Holocaust Memorial Museum and the Abraham Lincoln Presidential Library and Museum.

The museum contains more than 40,000 objects and artifacts, ranging from the time of Abraham through the New Testament period. Artifacts include biblical papyri, Torah scrolls, rare printed Bibles, Jewish artifacts and contemporary treasures of Christian and Jewish culture. The museum also exhibits significant archaeological artifacts owned by collaborating institutions and private collectors such as the Israel Antiquities Authority. Steve Green has donated other ancient artifacts from his personal collection. Additional initial exhibits include remains from Julia Ward Howe's original manuscript for the famous song "The Battle Hymn of the Republic" as well as a replica of the Liberty Bell upon which is engraved the Bible verse from Leviticus "Proclaim liberty throughout all the land unto all the inhabitants thereof".

The roof of the museum features a Biblical garden, where guests can see plant varieties mentioned throughout the Bible.

Manuscript collection
The manuscript collection of the Museum of the Bible includes one of the Bodmer Papyri (3rd/4th century), the Washington Pentateuch (ca. 1000), the Hours and Psalter of Elizabeth de Bohun, Countess of Northampton (1330–1340), the Lipnice Bible (1421), a Wycliffite New Testament (first half of the 15th century), the prayer book for young Charles V (1516–1519), and many others.

Food services
"Equinox" owners and "The Jewish Table" authors Todd and Ellen Gray operate a 165-seat, Mediterranean-inspired, fine-dining restaurant inside the museum. The Grays also provide catering for events at the museum. The museum also contains a more casual lunch and coffee shop, where some of the food offerings are certified as kosher.

Opening
On Thursday, November 16, 2017, museum officials held a private opening gala and reception for the facility at the Trump International Hotel Washington D.C. in the Old Post Office Building. A single seat at the fundraising event cost $2,500, while tables cost from $25,000 to $50,000. However, a number of museum employees and academic consultants refused to enter, citing the problem of having the event in a hotel affiliated with the president of the United States, Donald Trump.

The museum opened on Friday, November 17, in a private ceremony in the museum's theater that dedicated the facility. Pope Francis sent an official pontifical blessing for the museum's dedication. According to a message from the Vatican's Cardinal Secretary of State, Pietro Parolin, who had visited Washington earlier in the week, the Pope stated that "He is confident that those who revere the sacred scriptures as the word of God will here find nourishment for their faith, while many others will be introduced to a fascinating and vital chapter in the spiritual history of the human family".

The dedication ceremony, which nearly 500 people attended, began with the hymn "Amazing Grace" sung by Gospel singer CeCe Winans. After reading Parolin's message, Cardinal Donald Wuerl, the Archbishop of Washington, offered the ceremony's opening prayer, which was followed by prayers and remarks from Chaplain of the United States Senate Barry Black, Chief of Chaplains of the United States Navy Admiral Margaret Kibben and Mayor of the District of Columbia Muriel Bowser.

Ron Dermer, the Israeli ambassador to the United States, celebrated the museum as a signifier of the Jewish claim to Jerusalem. The Bible nurtured Jews through 2,000 years of exile until they were able to "rebuild the original DC — David's Capital," Dermer said at the dedication ceremony. Yariv Levin, the Israeli Tourism Minister, read a letter from the Israeli Prime Minister Benjamin Netanyahu, who had sent "warm greetings from Jerusalem, the eternal and undivided capital of Israel". Mor Dionysius John Kawak, archbishop of the Syriac Orthodox Church and other representatives of that Oriental Orthodox denomination were in attendance at an official dinner for the museum's opening.

When the museum opened to the public on Saturday, November 18, the lines outside were short. Some exhibits bustled with visitors, while others were nearly empty and the museum was far from capacity.

Reception
Historians Kelly Gannon and Kimberly Wagner evaluated the museum as a "testament to the power of Evangelical impulses tempered by a desire to legitimate the Bible as a centerpiece of conversation in American life." They conclude:
There is much that makes this museum great. The design of the space is stunning and well thought out. Likewise, the impressiveness of the technology cannot be overstated ... Finally, the collection is notable for its size and breadth ... Yet, despite all of this, MOTB remains a confusing amalgamation of historical and biblical scholarship, Evangelical influence, and the desire to be a modern attraction. While MOTB's intent is not necessarily proselytization, its aims and purpose are often obscured by unspoken ideological and theological battles raging just under the surface. With all of the forces pulling at Museum of the Bible, it loses its sense of identity and risks becoming an Evangelical tourist attraction, though it has the potential to be much more.

At first, the museum came under criticism for the original wording of its mission, which described an Evangelistic purpose of the museum, namely, to "inspire confidence in the absolute authority and reliability of the Bible." A later statement shifted away from that language. A revised 2013 mission statement reads, "We exist to invite all people to engage with the Bible. We invite Biblical exploration through museum exhibits and scholarly pursuits."

The current mission statement reads "Museum of the Bible is a global, innovative, educational institution whose purpose is to invite all people to engage with the transformative power of the Bible."

Lawrence Schiffman, an authority on the Dead Sea Scrolls and professor of Hebrew and Jewish studies at New York University stated, with respect to the Museum of the Bible:

With its many engaging and interactive elements, the Museum of the Bible has been described by Philip Kennicott as "a new standard for how this country's museums fuse entertainment and education." He went on to say that the Museum creates for its guests a "cultural experience," bringing together "history, art, architecture, theater, and music."

John Knutsen, assistant director of the St. Thomas More Institute and coordinator for evangelization and adult faith formation, wrote a review of the museum for The Catholic Herald. Knutsen wrote "Far from offering a shallow presentation, the Museum of the Bible is cultured, erudite, and remarkably diverse."

In contrast to these comments, Biblical scholars Joel Baden of Yale Divinity School and Candida Moss of University of Birmingham, who wrote the book Bible Nation: The United States of Hobby Lobby, expressed concerns about the museum's mission, saying, "They have misled the public at large by promoting a curriculum and a museum that tell only the story that the Greens want to tell, without acknowledging that scholars and experts have spent decades, indeed centuries, laboring to provide very different accounts of the Bible and its history."

After spending many hours while writing the book with museum founder Steve Green and president Cary Summers, they concluded:It's not really a museum of the Bible, it's a museum of American Protestantism. Their whole purpose is to show this country as a Christian country governed by Christian morality. (Moss)Their three-minute promo is fascinating demonstration of this problem. At least half of it is a reenactment of American history which has no bearing on the Biblethe signing of the Declaration of Independence, for example, or the Revolutionary War. The worry is that the museum portrays a story of the Bible that culminates in Protestantism and America. (Baden)In contrast, Christopher Rollston, a professor at George Washington University and expert on the Old Testament, was pleased with the museum’s efforts "to be quite historical in the wordings of the displays that they have," adding that "they have made it clear that they’re willing to listen to scholars' critiques."

John Fea, associate professor of American history at Messiah College, and chair of the history department, said, "It's hard to see this as anything other than an attempt to try to bring Christian values in the Bible's teachings as understood by Evangelical Protestants, like the Greens, into the center of American political life and American cultural life." However, the Catholic theologian Thomas L. McDonald, writing in the National Catholic Register praised the abundance of material dedicated to the history of the Bible with respect to Catholicism:
	 

A blog article in The Economist criticized the Museum of the Bible for focusing on Protestant, Jewish and Roman Catholic views, but ignoring the views of Eastern Orthodox Christianity and not mentioning the impact of the Bible on Islam or taking into account the opinions of scholars who do not consider that the Bible contains a coherent story. Biblical scholars have also accused the Museum of the Bible as "normalizing a Bible that authorizes white evangelical dominion."

Hobby Lobby smuggling scandal

Shipments of artifacts imported by Hobby Lobby in 2010 and 2011 were seized by US customs agents. The artifacts, largely clay bullae and cuneiform tablets from ancient Iraq, had in some cases been declared as "tile samples". Federal investigation culminated in a 2017 civil forfeiture action United States of America v. Approximately Four Hundred Fifty Ancient Cuneiform Tablets and Approximately Three Thousand Ancient Clay Bullae, after which Hobby Lobby agreed to forfeit and return more than 5500 artifacts, and to pay of a fine of $3 million. The artifacts in question had likely been looted from Iraq. Hobby Lobby was found to have used couriers that had willfully used methods to conceal the provenance of the allegedly stolen items. The museum released a statement that these artifacts were never owned by the Museum of the Bible and were never intended to be part of their collection. In 2018, the items were returned to Iraq, and the company paid a $3 million fine.

Scott Thumma, a dean and professor of sociology of religion at Hartford Seminary, defended Hobby Lobby during the smuggling controversy. Thuma stated: "Many of the collections of our great national museums and universities are full of the very objects that Hobby Lobby is being fined for smuggling and are seldom required to return or pay compensation."

In October 2019, officials from the British Egypt Exploration Society, a nonprofit organization that manages the Papyri Project, alleged that Oxford academic Dirk Obbink engaged in the theft and sale of "at least 11 ancient Bible fragments to the Green family, the Hobby Lobby owners who operate a Bible museum and charitable organization in Washington". The museum said it will return the fragments to the Egypt Exploration Society and Oxford University.

The Museum of the Bible's board chairman, Steve Green, who is also president of the Hobby Lobby stores, announced the museum will be returning over eleven thousand artifacts to Egypt and Iraq. The collection includes thousands of papyrus scraps and ancient clay pieces. Green admitted, "I knew little about the world of collecting ... The criticism of the museum resulting from my mistakes was justified." Manchester University papyrologist Roberta Mazza stated that the Green family "poured millions on the legal and illegal antiquities market without having a clue about the history, the material features, cultural value, fragilities, and problems of the objects."

This return includes the "Gilgamesh Dream Tablet," containing part of the Epic of Gilgamesh, which was discovered in Iraq in 1853, sold by the Jordanian Antiquities Association to an antiquities dealer in 2003, and sold again by an auction house to Hobby Lobby in 2014 for $1.6 million. The auction house lied about how the artifact had entered the market, claiming it had been on the market in the United States for decades. In September 2019, federal authorities seized the tablet, and in May 2020, a civil complaint was filed to forfeit it. In July 2021 the United States Department of Justice announced it had seized the Gilgamesh tablet from Hobby Lobby for repatriation to Iraq. Acting U.S. Attorney Jacquelyn M. Kasulis for the Eastern District of New York stated, "This office is committed to combating the black-market sale of cultural property and the smuggling of looted artifacts." Hobby Lobby failed to follow expert advice on antiquities collecting which has resulted in multiple seizures and fines.

Dead Sea Scrolls forgeries
Founder Steve Green donated Dead Sea Scrolls parchment fragments to the museum collection for its opening. When the museum catalog was released to the public, however, several outside experts expressed concern that the museum had not adequately accounted for the fragments' provenance. Arstein Justnes, a professor of biblical studies at the University of Agder in Norway, declared they were outright forgeries. The museum subsequently enlisted the German Federal Institute for Materials Research and Testing (Bundesanstalt für Materialforschung und Prüfung) to analyze the scrolls. The museum kept the fragments prominently on display for its official opening, while testing was still incomplete. The text of display stated that "scholars continue to debate the authenticity of this fragment". In 2018 the museum announced that expert examination had led it to conclude that five of the sixteen fragments of the Dead Sea Scrolls were forgeries and that the museum had removed them from display. According to the German researchers, those five showed "characteristics inconsistent with ancient origin". In March 2020, the museum confirmed all sixteen fragments were forgeries.

In her article covering the opening of the museum for ABC News, Veronica Stracqualursi recounts an interview with Christopher Rollston, a professor at George Washington University specializing on the Old Testament. Stracqualursi wrote that Rollston "said he was 'particularly pleased' that the museum chose to be 'honest' about the scrolls because museums are not generally candid about artifacts potentially being forgeries."

Gallery

References

External links

 
Bible museum replaces chief executive after one year, Washington Post
United States Files Civil Action To Forfeit Thousands Of Ancient Iraqi Artifacts Imported By Hobby Lobby, the July 2017 United States government complaint
Hobby Lobby to pay $3 million fine, forfeit ancient artifacts, CNN
Iraqi Artifacts Once Bought by Hobby Lobby Will Return Home, The New York Times
Hobby Lobby's Smuggled Artifacts Will Be Returned To Iraq, NPR
Some of Hobby Lobby’s Smuggled Artifacts May Come From Lost Sumerian City, Smithsonian
'It’s the First Domino': After the Museum of the Bible Discovered Its Dead Sea Scrolls Are Fake, the Field Braces for More Revelations, ArtNet News
Here are 16 of the biggest controversies in the craft chain's nearly 50-year history, Business Insider
Truth // Skewed History: The Museum of the Bible, Berlin Art Link

2017 establishments in Washington, D.C.
Christianity in Washington, D.C.
Bible-themed museums, zoos, and botanical gardens
History museums in Washington, D.C.
Jews and Judaism in Washington, D.C.
Kosher restaurants
Museums established in 2010
Religious museums in Washington, D.C.
Religious museums in the United States
Southwest Federal Center